Events in the year 1703 in Japan.

Incumbents
Monarch: Higashiyama
King of Ryukyu Kingdom : Shō Eki

Events
January 30 - The famed Forty-seven Samurai avenge their leader, Asano Naganori out of loyalty by attacking and killing Kira Kozuke no Suke Yoshinaka, despite being ordered not to. (Traditional Japanese Date: Fourteenth Day of the Twelfth Month, 1702)
December 31 - The 1703 Genroku earthquake occurred on 2:00 local time, killing 2,300.

Births 

 Fukuda Chiyo-ni

Deaths 

 Kira Yoshinaka
 Ōishi Yoshio
 Horibe Yasubee

References

 
1700s in Japan
Japan
Years of the 18th century in Japan